Bruce is a town situated along the Skuna River in Calhoun County, Mississippi, United States. As of the 2010 census, it had a population of 1,939.

History
The town was named for E. L. Bruce, founder of the E. L. Bruce Company, a sawmill operation. The sawmill industry is still vital in the town, with Weyerhaeuser operating a mill; Bruce is also home to other independently owned mills.

Geography
Bruce is located in north-central Calhoun County. Mississippi Highway 32 crosses Highway 9 in the center of Bruce and leads east  to New Houlka and northwest  to Water Valley.

The Skuna River, a tributary of the Yalobusha River and then the Yazoo River, passes south of the town.

Demographics

2020 census

As of the 2020 United States Census, there were 1,707 people, 714 households, and 335 families residing in the town.

2000 census
As of the census of 2000, there were 2,097 people, 889 households, and 562 families residing in the town. The population density was 818.8 people per square mile (316.3/km2). There were 1,005 housing units at an average density of 392.4/sq mi (151.6/km2). The racial makeup of the town was 53.27% White, 44.35% African American, 0.52% Native American, 0.86% from other races, and 1.00% from two or more races. Hispanic or Latino of any race were 1.19% of the population.

There were 889 households, out of which 28.9% had children under the age of 18 living with them, 37.3% were married couples living together, 22.2% had a female householder with no husband present, and 36.7% were non-families. 34.9% of all households were made up of individuals, and 17.3% had someone living alone who was 65 years of age or older. The average household size was 2.32 and the average family size was 2.98.

In the town, the population was spread out, with 27.8% under the age of 18, 8.2% from 18 to 24, 25.1% from 25 to 44, 21.7% from 45 to 64, and 17.2% who were 65 years of age or older. The median age was 36 years. For every 100 females, there were 86.7 males. For every 100 females age 18 and over, there were 79.0 males.

The median income for a household in the town was $20,417, and the median income for a family was $31,806. Males had a median income of $34,063 versus $21,380 for females. The per capita income for the town was $14,233. About 20.1% of families and 29.3% of the population were below the poverty line, including 46.6% of those under age 18 and 26.6% of those age 65 or over.

Education
The town of Bruce is served by the Calhoun County School District. There are three public schools in the district: Bruce, Calhoun City, and Vardaman. Bruce is a Level 5 High School, which is the highest academic ranking in Mississippi. Calhoun City is slightly smaller than Bruce High School. Bruce and Calhoun City High are both District 2A schools, and Vardaman High is a District 1A school.
 
The Bruce Trojan High School baseball team were 2A State Champions in 2012, the Bruce Lady Trojan High basketball team were 2A State Champions in 1998 and 2002, and the Bruce Trojan High School football team were 2A State Champions in 1996.

Notable people
 Charles Beckett, member of the Mississippi House of Representatives
 Ron Lundy, former WABC-AM and WCBS-FM disc jockey
 Armegis Spearman, former National Football League player and former Ole Miss (University of Mississippi) linebacker
 Larry Stewart, philanthropist known for being the original Secret Santa 
 Frederick Thomas, former National Football League player
 Leo Welch, blues musician

References

External links

Towns in Calhoun County, Mississippi
Towns in Mississippi